This historical list of the ten largest countries by GDP compiled by British economist Angus Maddison shows how much the membership and rankings of the world's ten largest economies has changed.

Ten largest economies by GDP (PPP)

Fifteen largest economies by GDP (PPP)

References 

Lists of countries by GDP
International Monetary Fund
Economy-related lists of superlatives